The Centurions is the first in a historical fiction series about the 1st-century Roman Empire. Set primarily in Roman Britain circa AD 72–75, it follows the adventures of a pair of Roman brothers – one free-born and one slave-born – as they serve in the Roman legions.

The Centurions series was written by Amanda Cockrell writing under the pseudonym Damion Hunter. In her own name, Cockrell also has written a separate novel of Roman Britain called The Legions of the Mist (1979).

The other three books in the series are Barbarian Princess, The Emperor's Games, and The Border Wolves. The three first books were written back in the 1980s, while the last novel in the series was published in 2021 finally wrapping up the story.

References

The Centurions Trilogy
1981 American novels
Novels set in the 1st century
Ballantine Books books